Sajjangarh Wildlife Sanctuary is located in Udaipur District of Rajasthan in the southern Aravalli Hills. The area of the sanctuary is 5.19 square kilometres. The  sanctuary is located entirely within Girwa Tehsil of Udaipur district.

History 
The area constituted the hunting grounds surrounding the Monsoon Palace, used by the Maharanas of Udaipur in the late 19th  and early 20th centuries. 

The area was made a wildlife sanctuary in 1987. In 2017, an area of 28.7 square kilometres around the boundary of the sanctuary was declared to be an Eco-Sensitive Zone by the Government of India.

Flora and Fauna

References

Udaipur district
Tourist attractions in Udaipur district
Wildlife sanctuaries in Rajasthan
1987 establishments in Rajasthan
Protected areas established in 1987